In the run-up to the 1983 general election, various organisations carried out opinion polling to gauge voting intention. Results of such polls are displayed in this article. The date ranges for these opinion polls are from the 1979 general election until 6 June 1983.

Polling results 
All data is from UK Polling Report.

1983

1982

1981

1980

1979

References 

Opinion polling for United Kingdom general elections